The Chief of the Defence Staff (CFst, or Försvarsstabschef) was from 1937 to 1993 the second most senior member of the Swedish Armed Forces (after the Supreme Commander) and headed the Defence Staff. The position was held by a senior member of one of the three main branches of the Swedish Armed Forces.

Chiefs of the Defence Staff

Vice Chiefs of the Defence Staff

See also
Chief of the General Staff

Footnotes

References

Notes

Print

Military appointments of Sweden
Sweden